Hassan Pakravan (4 August 1911 – 11 April 1979) was a well-known diplomat and minister in the Pahlavi pre-revolutionary government of Iran. He is not only notable for his political involvement with the Mohammad Reza Pahlavi government and SAVAK, but also his relationship with Ruhollah Khomeini.

Early life and education
Hassan Pakravan, son of Fathollah and Emineh, was born in Tehran on 4 August 1911 (13 Mordad 1290 AP). His father held many high government posts, including governor of Khorasan Province and ambassador to Italy. His mother, partly of European descent, was a professor at the University of Tehran. She was awarded the prestigious French Prix Rivarol, which the French government gives to foreign authors who write directly in French. She was related to the Habsburg rulers of the Austro-Hungarian empire.

As a child, Pakravan accompanied his parents to Cairo, where his father was appointed diplomatic agent. There, he received his primary education at the Lycée Français. He was then sent to Liège, Belgium where he attended high school and university. Pakravan then studied at the artillery school in Poitiers, France, and the Ecole d’Application d’Artillerie in Fontainebleau.

Career
In the 1940-1970s, Hassan Pakravan held many politically important, military and diplomatic posts, among them:
 military attaché in Pakistan (1949–1950);
 chief of army intelligence (1951–1953);
 military attaché in India (1954–1957);
 deputy chief of the State Intelligence and Security Organization in charge of external affairs (1957–1961);
 deputy prime minister and chief of SAVAK (1961–1965);
 minister of information (1965–1966);
 ambassador to Pakistan (1966–1969);
 ambassador to France (1969–1973);
 senior counselor to the Ministry of Court (1974–1979).

Pakravan was known for being more compassionate than any of National Security and Information Department's other directors.  However, Muhammad Reza Shah replaced Pakravan with his childhood friend Nematollah Nassiri in 1965.  He returned to Iran in 1976 and was brought out of retirement in 1978 by the Shah in a last-ditch effort to curb corruption at the Royal Court. Pakravan's supporters noted his aristocratic and impeccable character as well as his intelligence and moral courage to be a source of consolation at the difficult times of 1978–79 when the Iranian Revolution took control of the opposition and eventually seized power.

Head of SAVAK
One of his first decisions as head of SAVAK was to refrain from any form of torture during interrogations.

Relationship with Ayatollah Khomeini

One of the more fascinating segments of the memoirs of General Pakravan's wife is the description of her husband's weekly luncheons with Ayatollah Ruhollah Khomeini in 1963, when the Ayatollah was under house arrest.

According to General Pakravan, "The ayatollah used to say in this very flowery Eastern way, 'Timsar [General], I count the days until we reach the day of our luncheon.'" He described the ayatollah as, very handsome, someone with extraordinary presence, a power of seduction and great charisma. They talked about religion, philosophy, and history. General Pakravan also found him to be very ambitious and secretive. "So much so that it made my hair stand on end. It was frightening," he told his wife.

Mrs. Pakravan confirms the well-known story that her husband saved Ayatollah Khomeini's life in 1963. He was condemned to death and General Pakravan was upset by that. Pakravan felt that Khomeini's execution would anger the common people of Iran. He knew that the population of the country is not its elite. He presented his argument to the shah. Once he had convinced the shah to allow him to find a way out, he called on Ayatollah Mohammad-Kazem Shariatmadari, one of the senior religious leaders of Iran, and asked for his help. Ayatollah Shariatmadari suggested that Khomeini be made a grand ayatollah. So, they made a religious decree which was taken by General Pakravan and Seyyed Jalal Tehrani to the Shah.

Arrest and death
After the Iranian Revolution, Pakravan was among the first of the Shah's officials to be executed. He was not allowed to have access to a lawyer and the charges filed against him were vague. Given the fact that he was retired at the time of the revolution, his execution seemed all the more unjust.  Pakravan was a key player in convincing the Shah to commute the death sentence on Khomeini in 1963 and instead sending him to exile.  Khomeini was first sent to Turkey, and then to Iraq, where he stayed until his expulsion and relocation to France in 1978.

In her memoirs, Mrs. Pakravan provides the description of the arrest, imprisonment, and execution of her husband by the Islamic Revolutionary Court. She argues that General Pakravan was taken from his house to an unknown destination. When his son tried to contact him, he was told that the general was not arrested at all but that he was the guest of the Ayatollah. But in fact he was imprisoned shortly after his arrest.

After his death sentence was read in mid-April 1979 Pakravan told the judges that he had accepted all the responsibilities then, and he accepted them now.

References

External links
Harvard.edu, Harvard Iranian Oral History Project: transcript of interview with Fatemeh Pakravan conducted by Dr. Habib Ladjevardi 3 March 1983]
HolyCrime.com, Hassan Pakravan – Biography Warning: This site contains graphic images (mugshot of corpse.)
Iranian.com, "Lunch with Khomeini – How a former SAVAK chief saved the ayatollah's life". The Iranian

20th-century diplomats
20th-century Iranian politicians
1911 births
1979 deaths
Ambassadors of Iran to France
Ambassadors of Iran to Pakistan
Directors of SAVAK
Government ministers of Iran
Iranian expatriates in Belgium
Iranian expatriates in Egypt
Iranian expatriates in France
Imperial Iranian Army personnel
Military personnel executed during the Iranian Revolution
People from Tehran